Fântânele may refer to several places in Romania:

 Fântânele, Arad, a commune in Arad County
 Fântânele, Constanța, a commune in Constanţa County
 Fântânele, Iași, a commune in Iaşi County
 Fântânele, Mureș, a commune in Mureș County
 Fântânele, Prahova, a commune in Prahova County
 Fântânele, Suceava, a commune in Suceava County
 Fântânele, Teleorman, a commune in Teleorman County
 Fântânele, a village in Ceru-Băcăinți Commune, Alba County
 Fântânele, a village in Hemeiuș Commune, Bacău County
 Fântânele, a village in Motoșeni Commune, Bacău County
 Fântânele, a village in Matei Commune, Bistriţa-Năsăud County
 Fântânele, a village in Mărgăritești Commune, Buzău County
 Fântânele, a village in Năeni Commune, Buzău County
 Fântânele, a village in Cojasca Commune, Dâmboviţa County
 Fântânele, a village in Radovan Commune, Dolj County
 Fântânele, a village in Teslui Commune, Dolj County
 Fântânele, a village in Scânteiești Commune, Galaţi County
 Fântânele, a village in Urdari Commune, Gorj County
 Fântânele, a village in Andrieşeni Commune, Iaşi County
 Fântânele, a village in Târgu Lăpuş town, Maramureș County
 Fântânele, a village in Dragu Commune, Sălaj County
 Fântânele, a village in Săliște town, Sibiu County
 Fântânele, a village in Puieşti Commune, Vaslui County

Other 
 Fântânele River (disambiguation)

See also 
 Fântâna (disambiguation)